The American Freedmen's Inquiry Commission was charged by U.S. Secretary of War Edwin McMasters Stanton in March 1863 with investigating the status of the slaves and former slaves who were freed by the Emancipation Proclamation.  Stanton appointed Dr. Samuel Gridley Howe, James McKaye, and Robert Dale Owen as commissioners, all three of whom served from the creation of the committee in 1863 through to their submission of its final report in May 1864.

Background
Commission members and staff traveled to the American South, where they interviewed former slaves and Union field commanders to get a better grasp of the situation and of the "condition and capacity" of freed slaves. Howe and his secretary also traveled to Canada West, where thousands of former slaves had settled after gaining freedom in Canada. He visited their communities, interviewed freedmen and government officials, and noted their progress in a free country where they were enfranchised and their rights protected by the government.

Through its report, the Commission recommended that the government help support freedmen through their transition to a free life. Their report was submitted to Congress and its findings debated. Its recommendations contributed to the passage by Congress of a bill authorizing formation of the Freedmen's Bureau, to help manage the transition of freedmen to freedom.

The Commission used Federal money to establish schools and churches in the South in an attempt to employ and educate former slaves. The commission's mission was successful, and the bill's life was extended in Congress in January 1866.

Included in its reporting of the dire conditions faced by many freedmen in the South, the Commission reported that there had been instances of Union Army soldiers stealing from already poverty stricken African-American "contrabands" in Virginia. The following documents the looting:

The report fully described the poverty and difficult conditions of most former slaves in the South, as aspects of the society. Some members of Congress found it hard to believe that such conditions existed in the United States.

Robert Dale Owen later re-published the full final report as a book titled The Wrong of Slavery, the Right of Emancipation, and the Future of the African Race in the United States.

Footnotes

References
 , Preliminary Report of the American Freedmen's Inquiry Commission.
 , Final Report of the American Freedmen's Inquiry Commission.
 American Freedmen's Inquiry Commission Records Guide, Harvard University Library.

Bibliography
Dr. Samuel Gridley Howe, Refugees from Slavery in Canada West: Report to the Freedmen's Inquiry Commission, (Boston: Wright and Potter, Printers, 1864/reprint Arno Press, 1969), available as e-text online
Owen, Robert Dale, James McKaye, and Samuel G. Howe. Preliminary Report Touching the Condition and Management of Emancipated Refugees; Made to the Secretary of War, by the American Freedmen's Inquiry Commission, June 30, 1863. New York, NY: John F. Trow, 1863.

Slavery in the United States
Washington, D.C., in the American Civil War
Freedmen's Bureau